Wei Fenghe (born February 1954) is a general (shang jiang) in the People's Liberation Army who served as commander of the PLA Rocket Force, formerly known as the Second Artillery Corps. He was Minister of National Defence, the first to have not come from the PLA Ground Forces and the first-ranked State Councilor in Li Keqiang Cabinet II from March 2018 to March 2023, and also the first-ranked ordinary Member of the Xi Jinping-chaired Central Military Commission.

Biography 
Wei Fenghe was born in Liaocheng, Shandong. He joined the People's Liberation Army in December 1970, at the age of 16. Wei graduated from the Second Artillery Command Academy's Command Department in 1984, and rose from the ranks of the Second Artillery Corps to the rank of general. Wei replaced Jing Zhiyuan as commander of the Second Artillery Corps in October 2012, and was promoted to the rank of general in November 2012. Prior to becoming commander of the Second Artillery, Wei served as deputy chief of staff on the PLA General Staff Department, a first for a Second Artillery officer. Wei also served as chief of staff of the Second Artillery, deputy chief of staff of the Second Artillery, 53rd Base commander, 54th Base chief of staff, and a variety of other command positions in the Second Artillery.

In January 1972, Wei joined the Chinese Communist Party. Wei was an alternate member of the 17th Central Committee of the Chinese Communist Party, and member of the 18th Central Committee of the Chinese Communist Party.

On March 19, 2018, Wei was appointed as the Minister of National Defence and the State Councilor.

On June 2, 2019, a few days before the 30th anniversary of the 1989 Tianamen Square crackdown, Wei defended the actions of the government in the 1989 events in Tiananmen Square and the handling of the protests by the government, saying the government "was decisive in stopping the turbulence".

On December 1, 2020, Wei was awarded the Nishan-e-Imtiaz for his services in promoting defense cooperation between Pakistan and China.

On 11 June 2022, U.S. Secretary of Defense Lloyd Austin condemned China's "provocative, destabilising" military activity near Taiwan, a day after Wei warned Austin that "if anyone dares to split Taiwan from China, the Chinese army will definitely not hesitate to start a war no matter the cost." Wei further said that the People’s Liberation Army "would have no choice but to fight … and crush any attempt of Taiwan independence, safeguarding national sovereignty and territorial integrity."

See also
2022 Chinese military exercises around Taiwan

References 

1954 births
Living people
People from Liaocheng
People's Liberation Army generals from Shandong
Ministers of National Defense of the People's Republic of China
State councillors of China
Members of the 19th Central Committee of the Chinese Communist Party
Recipients of Nishan-e-Imtiaz